René Murat Auberjonois (June 1, 1940 – December 8, 2019) was an American actor and director. He was best known for portraying Odo on Star Trek: Deep Space Nine (1993–1999). He first achieved fame as a stage actor, winning the Tony Award for Best Featured Actor in a Musical in 1970 for his portrayal of Sebastian Baye opposite Katharine Hepburn in the André Previn-Alan Jay Lerner musical Coco. He went on to earn three more Tony nominations for performances in Neil Simon's The Good Doctor (1973), Roger Miller's Big River (1985), and Cy Coleman's City of Angels (1989); he won a Drama Desk Award for Big River.

A screen actor with more than 200 credits, Auberjonois was most famous for portraying characters in the main casts of several long-running television series, including Clayton Endicott III on Benson (1979–1986), for which he was an Emmy Award nominee, and Paul Lewiston on Boston Legal (2004–2008). In films, Auberjonois portrayed Father Mulcahy in the film version of M*A*S*H (1970); the expedition scientist Roy Bagley in King Kong (1976); Chef Louis in The Little Mermaid (1989), in which he sang "Les Poissons"; and Reverend Oliver in The Patriot (2000).  In the American animated musical comedy film Cats Don't Dance (1997), Auberjonois voiced Flanagan.

Auberjonois performed as a voice actor in a number of popular video games. He provided the voice of Janos Audron in the Legacy of Kain series (2001–2003); the enigmatic Mr. House in Fallout: New Vegas (2010); Karl Schafer in the Uncharted video game series; and Odo in Star Trek Online (2018 expansion).

Early life 
Auberjonois was born  June 1, 1940, in New York City. His father, Swiss-born Fernand Auberjonois, was a Cold War-era foreign correspondent and Pulitzer Prize-nominated writer.  Auberjonois' mother, Laure Louise Napoléone Eugénie Caroline Murat, was a great-great-granddaughter of Joachim Murat (one of Napoleon's marshals and King of Naples during the First French Empire), and his wife—Napoleon's youngest sister—Caroline Bonaparte.    Auberjonois had a sister and a brother, and two half-sisters from his mother's first marriage. Auberjonois wrote that his French family name, an uncommon one in the United States, means "armorer."

Auberjonois' grandfather, also René Auberjonois, was a Swiss post-Impressionist painter.  His maternal grandmother, Hélène Macdonald Stallo, was an American from Cincinnati, Ohio; his maternal grandfather's mother was a Russian noblewoman, Eudoxia Michailovna Somova, and his maternal grandfather's paternal grandmother, Caroline Georgina Fraser, who was the wife of Prince Napoleon Lucien Charles Murat, was an American from Charleston, South Carolina.

Auberjonois' family moved to Paris after World War II.  After a few years in France, the family moved back to the United States and joined the South Mountain Road artists' colony in Rockland County, New York, whose residents included Burgess Meredith, John Houseman, and Lotte Lenya.

The Auberjonois family also lived for a time in London, where Auberjonois completed high school while studying theatre. To complete his education, he attended the Carnegie Institute of Technology (now Carnegie Mellon University), and graduated with a Bachelor of Fine Arts from the College of Fine Arts in 1962.

Career

Theatre 
After college, Auberjonois worked with several different theatre companies, beginning at the prestigious Arena Stage in Washington, D.C., and then he traveled between Los Angeles, California, and New York, working in numerous theatre productions. He helped found the American Conservatory Theater in San Francisco, the Mark Taper Forum in Los Angeles, and the Brooklyn Academy of Music Repertory Company in New York City. He was a member of the Peninsula Players summer theater program during the 1962 season.

In 1968, Auberjonois landed a role on Broadway, and appeared in three plays that season: as Fool to Lee J. Cobb's King Lear (the longest running production of the play in Broadway history), as Ned in A Cry of Players (which played in repertory with King Lear), opposite Frank Langella, and as Marco in Fire! In 1969, he earned a Tony Award for his performance as Sebastian Baye alongside Katharine Hepburn in Coco.

He received Tony nominations for his roles in Neil Simon's The Good Doctor (1973) opposite Christopher Plummer; as the Duke in Big River (1984), winning a Drama Desk Award; and, memorably, as Buddy Fidler/Irwin S. Irving in City of Angels (1989), written by Larry Gelbart and Cy Coleman.

Auberjonois' other Broadway appearances included Malvolio in Twelfth Night (1972); Scapin in Tricks (1973); Mr. Samsa in Metamorphosis (1989); Professor Abronsius in Dance of the Vampires, the English-language version of Jim Steinman's musical adaptation of Tanz der Vampire; and Jethro Crouch in Sly Fox (2004), for which he was nominated for Outstanding Featured Actor In A Play, an Outer Critics Circle Award.

Auberjonois appeared many times at the Mark Taper Forum, notably as Malvolio in Twelfth Night and as Stanislavski in Chekhov in Yalta. As a member of the Second Drama Quartet, he toured with Ed Asner, Dianne Wiest, and Harris Yulin. He appeared in the Tom Stoppard and André Previn work, Every Good Boy Deserves Favor, at the John F. Kennedy Center for the Performing Arts in Washington, D.C., and the Metropolitan Opera in New York.

He directed many theatrical productions, and starred in the Washington, D.C. production of 12 Angry Men (2004), where he portrayed "Juror #5" to Roy Scheider's "#8" and Robert Prosky's "#3". He made his debut at the Shakespeare Theatre Company in Washington, D.C. in 2008 as the titular character in Molière's The Imaginary Invalid.

He was on the advisory board of Sci-Fest LA, the first annual Los Angeles Science Fiction One-Act Play Festival, held in May 2014.

In 2018, Auberjonois was inducted into the American Theater Hall of Fame.

Films 
Auberjonois played Father Mulcahy in the original film version of M*A*S*H. His subsequent film roles included the gangster Tony in Police Academy 5: Assignment Miami Beach (1988), and Reverend Oliver in The Patriot (2000). He made cameo appearances in a number of films, including: Dr. Burton, a mental asylum doctor patterned after Tim Burton, in Batman Forever (1995), and a bird expert who gradually transforms into a bird in Robert Altman's 1970 film Brewster McCloud. He appeared as Colonel West in the 1991 Star Trek film Star Trek VI: The Undiscovered Country. His other notable film appearances include; McCabe & Mrs. Miller (1971), Images (1972), Pete 'n' Tillie (1972), The Hindenburg (1975), King Kong (1976), The Big Bus (1976), Eyes of Laura Mars (1978), Where the Buffalo Roam (1980), Walker (1987), My Best Friend Is a Vampire (1987), The Feud (1989), Inspector Gadget (1999), and Eulogy (2004).

Auberjonois portrayed the character of Straight Hollander in the 1993 Miramax film The Ballad of Little Jo. He voiced Professor Genius in Little Nemo: Adventures in Slumberland, Louis the Chef in the 1st and 2nd Little Mermaid films, Flanagan in Cats Don't Dance, the Butler in Joseph: King of Dreams, and the concierge in Planes: Fire & Rescue.

In 2019, Auberjonois portrayed the title role in Raising Buchanan as mediocre U.S. president James Buchanan.

Television 

In addition to having been a regular actor on three television shows (Benson, a situation comedy; Star Trek: Deep Space Nine in science fiction; and Boston Legal, a legal comedy drama), Auberjonois guest starred on many television series, including; Nash Bridges, Ellery Queen, Family, Grey's Anatomy, The Rockford Files, Charlie's Angels, Starsky & Hutch, Wonder Woman, Harry O, The Jeffersons, The Outer Limits, Night Gallery, Hart to Hart, Matlock, Murder, She Wrote, The Bionic Woman, Frasier, Judging Amy, Chicago Hope, The Bob Newhart Show, Star Trek: Enterprise, Stargate SG-1, Warehouse 13, Archer, L.A. Law, The Practice (for which he received an Emmy nomination, playing a different character than the one he played on The Practice spinoff Boston Legal), Saving Grace, It's Always Sunny in Philadelphia, Criminal Minds, NCIS, The Good Wife, The Librarians, and Madam Secretary.

His television movie credits include The Rhinemann Exchange, The Dark Secret of Harvest Home, Disney's Geppetto, Gore Vidal's Billy The Kid, the remake of A Connecticut Yankee in King Arthur's Court, and the Sally Hemings: An American Scandal (2000) miniseries. He portrayed the character Fortunato in an episode of American Masters entitled "Edgar Allan Poe: Terror of the Soul" (1995). He received a third Emmy Award nomination for his performance in ABC's The Legend of Sleepy Hollow. He played NASA scientist Dr. Felix Blackwell in the episode "Phoenix" on NCIS.

Auberjonois voiced animated roles, including characters on Snorks, Batman: The Animated Series, Leonard McLeish on Pound Puppies (2010), Avatar: The Last Airbender, Master Fung in the first episodes of Xiaolin Showdown (before being replaced by Maurice LaMarche), Azmuth on Ben 10: Omniverse, Renard Dumont on The Legend of Tarzan, Justice League Unlimited, Max Steel, Fantastic Max, Challenge of the GoBots (as the treacherous "Dr. Braxis"), Archer, Young Justice, Random! Cartoons, and Avengers Assemble. He lent his voice talents to the 2001 Public Broadcasting System (PBS) American Experience documentary "Woodrow Wilson" as the title character, along with the 2003 PBS historical documentary Kingdom of David: The Saga of the Israelites.

Auberjonois directed television shows, including Marblehead Manor, and various episodes of Deep Space Nine.

Voice acting 

Auberjonois was active in radio drama. He read "The Stunt" by Mordechai Strigler for the National Public Radio (NPR) series Jewish Stories From the Old World to the New, and he recorded novels on tape. On PRI, he was featured numerous times on Selected Shorts, reading works of dramatic fiction. His voice was heard in Disney's The Little Mermaid (receiving alphabetical top billing as Louis the Chef and singing "Les Poissons"), and as The Skull in The Last Unicorn.

He did voice work on the Challenge of the GoBots series in 1980s as Dr. Braxis, He was the voice of Peter Parker on the 1972 Buddah Records Spider-Man LP "From Beyond the Grave" (BDS 5119), a radio-style narrative replete with sound effects and rock and roll song interludes provided by "The Webspinners", in which the characters of The Vulture, The Lizard, Green Goblin, The Kingpin, Aunt May and Doctor Strange appeared.

In 1984–1985, he lent his voice to DeSaad, an associate of the villainous Darkseid on the animated series Super Friends. From 1986 to 1987, he voiced Alvinar in the cartoons series Wildfire. He also provided the voice of Professor Genius in Little Nemo: Adventures in Slumberland.

He provided the voice for Janos Audron, an ancient vampire in the Legacy of Kain video game series; he was in Soul Reaver 2, Blood Omen 2, and Legacy of Kain: Defiance. He provided the voice of Angler in the Pirates of the Caribbean: At World's End video game. He voice-played General Zod in the Joseph Ruby-Kenneth Spears animated Superman series episode titled "The Hunter".

Auberjonois provided minor character voices for Justice League, reprising his role as Desaad, and parts such as 2003's "In Blackest Night," as Kanjar-Ro, a pirate testifying in the trial of the Green Lantern, and as a fellow member of the Green Lantern Corps in other episodes.

In 2003, he provided the voice of Natori in the English dubbed version of semi-sequel to the Hayao Miyazaki film Whisper of the Heart, The Cat Returns. He reprised an animated version of his character Odo from Star Trek: Deep Space Nine in a cutaway joke in Family Guys Stewie Griffin: The Untold Story. The cutaway featured a more humanoid-faced Odo threatening Stewie's alleged cousin Quark Griffin. Auberjonois also lent his voice to Skylanders: SuperChargers.

In 2011, he voiced villain Mark Desmond in Cartoon Network's Young Justice. He was also the voice of Leonard McLeish in the Pound Puppies series, Pepé Le Pew in 2011 on The Looney Tunes Show, Azmuth in Ben 10: Omniverse, and Ebony Maw in Avengers Assemble.

Video games 

One of Auberjonois' earliest forays into video game voice acting was the role of Janos Audron in Soul Reaver 2; he continued to voice the character in subsequent releases in the Legacy of Kain series. According to a behind-the-scenes featurette in Soul Reaver 2, showing candid discussions among the voice actors during recording, he was surprised at the quality of the writing, asking, "This is for a video game?!" when the purpose of the recordings was brought to light.

Auberjonois provided the voice of Karl Schäfer, the honourable German explorer in the video game Uncharted 2: Among Thieves, and Mr. House, the reclusive New Vegas casino owner in the 2010 video game Fallout: New Vegas. He also voiced Dr. Ignatio Mobius in Command & Conquer: Renegade. He reprised his role as Odo in the game Star Trek: Deep Space Nine: The Fallen. In June, 2018 he reprised his role as Odo in the massively multiplayer online role-playing game Star Trek Online.

Personal life 
Auberjonois was married to his wife Judith Mihalyi from 1963 until his death in 2019. They had two children, Tessa and Remy.

Illness and death 
In an interview with Compassion & Choices Magazine, Judith Auberjonois revealed that René underwent chemotherapy for lung cancer in 2018. It was discovered in 2019 that the cancer had spread to his brain. Due to the potential for serious cognitive side effects, Auberjonois chose not to pursue the whole-brain radiation treatment suggested by his doctors.

As a resident of California, Auberjonois decided to seek medical aid in dying under the California End of Life Option Act. On December 6, 2019, he spent his final hours with his family at his home in Los Angeles reminiscing over photos and listening to music. He then took the medication prescribed for assisted suicide and died at the age of 79. The California End of Life Option Act stipulates that death certificates should list the underlying terminal illness as the cause of death, rather than the use of life-ending medications. His cause of death was given as metastatic lung cancer.

Filmography

Live-action

Animation

Video games

Deep Space Nine directorial credits

Book narrations 
Auberjonois' voice talents also included book narrations.

The Pendergast novels 
 The Cabinet of Curiosities (2002)
 Still Life with Crows (2003)
 Diogenes Trilogy
 Brimstone (2004)
 Dance of Death (2005)
 The Book of the Dead (2006)
 The Wheel of Darkness (2007)
 Cemetery Dance (2009)
 Helen Trilogy
 Fever Dream (2010)
 Cold Vengeance (2011)
 Two Graves (2012)
 White Fire (2013)
 Blue Labyrinth (2014)
 Crimson Shore (2015)
 The Obsidian Chamber (2016)
 City of Endless Night (2018)
 Verses for the Dead (2018)

Other books

References

External links 

 
 
 
 
 
 
 

1940 births
2019 suicides
20th-century American male actors
21st-century American male actors
American male film actors
American male musical theatre actors
American male television actors
American male video game actors
American male voice actors
American people of Corsican descent
American people of French descent
American people of Russian descent
American people of Swiss descent
American television directors
Audiobook narrators
Carnegie Mellon University College of Fine Arts alumni
Deaths by euthanasia
Deaths from lung cancer in California
Drama Desk Award winners
House of Bonaparte
Male actors from New York City
Murat
People from Boonville, California
People from Rockland County, New York
Tony Award winners